The 1928–29 season was the 54th season of competitive football in England.

Honours

Notes = Number in parentheses is the times that club has won that honour. * indicates new record for competition

Football League

First Division

Second Division

Third Division North

Third Division South

Top goalscorers

First Division
Dave Halliday (Sunderland) – 43 goals

Second Division
Jimmy Hampson (Blackpool) – 40 goals

Third Division North
Jimmy McConnell (Carlisle United) – 42 goals

Third Division South
Andy Rennie (Luton Town) – 43 goals

References